Wynn's Hotel may refer to:
 Any Wynn Resorts hotel
 Wynn Las Vegas in particular 
 Wynn's Hotel, Dublin, historic hotel on O'Connell Street, Dublin, Ireland